Paoni (Paōni), also known as Payni (Paüní) and Ba'unah (Ba'una), is the tenth month of the ancient  Egyptian and Coptic calendars. It lasts between June 8 and July 7 of the Gregorian calendar. Paoni is also the second month of the Season of Shemu (Harvest) in Ancient Egypt, where the Egyptians harvest their crops throughout the land.

Name
The name "Paoni" derives from its original Egyptian name "Month of the Valley Festival" in reference to an annual celebration of Thebes.

Coptic Synaxarium of the month of Paoni

References

Citations

Bibliography
 Synaxarium of the month of Baona

Months of the Coptic calendar
Egyptian calendar